Scotch Run may refer to:

Scotch Run (Black Creek), a stream in Luzerne County, Pennsylvania
Scotch Run (Catawissa Creek), a stream in Columbia County, Pennsylvania

See also
Scotch Creek (disambiguation)